Aleksandr Vorobyov (born 27 October 1969) is a Russian cross-country skier. He competed in the men's 50 kilometre classical event at the 1994 Winter Olympics.

Cross-country skiing results
All results are sourced from the International Ski Federation (FIS).

Olympic Games

World Championships

World Cup

Season standings

Team podiums
 1 podium

References

External links
 

1969 births
Living people
Russian male cross-country skiers
Olympic cross-country skiers of Russia
Cross-country skiers at the 1994 Winter Olympics
Place of birth missing (living people)